Davide Anthony “Dave” Nicoletti (born March 22, 1986) is a Canadian-born Italian former professional ice hockey defenceman.

Nicoletti played in NCAA Division I for the Alabama–Huntsville Chargers before turning professional in 2010 with SG Pontebba in Italy's Serie A where he stayed for two seasons. He split the 2012-13 season playing in the Elite Ice Hockey League in the United Kingdom for the Braehead Clan and the ECHL for the Cincinnati Cyclones. He then moved to the Erste Bank Eishockey Liga based in Austria to join Italian team HC Bolzano, where he was part of the team that became the first non-Austrian team to win the EBEL Championship. He returned to Serie A in 2015 for HC Valpellice before making a brief return to Bolzano in the EBEL, playing in three regular season games and six playoff games.

Nicoletti represented Team Italy in the 2014 IIHF World Championship.

References

External links

1986 births
Living people
Ice hockey people from Toronto
Canadian ice hockey defencemen
Alabama–Huntsville Chargers men's ice hockey players
SG Pontebba players
Cincinnati Cyclones (ECHL) players
Braehead Clan players
Bolzano HC players
HC Valpellice players
Canadian sportspeople of Italian descent
Canadian expatriate ice hockey players in Scotland
Naturalised citizens of Italy
Italian ice hockey defencemen
Canadian expatriate ice hockey players in the United States